Doroftei is a Romanian surname. Notable people with the surname include:

 Bogdan Doroftei (born 1995), Romanian rugby union footballer
 Leonard Doroftei (born 1970), Romanian-Canadian boxer

Romanian-language surnames